Alt For Egil is a 2004 Norwegian musical film directed by Tore Rygh, starring Kristoffer Joner and Trond Høvik. Egil Hjelmeland (Joner) is a pizza delivery driver who decides to teach his best friend Jan-Ove Tofte (Høvik), who is mentally retarded, how to drive the delivery car. The title is a play on 'Alt for Norge' (Norwegian: All for Norway) which is a patriotic Norwegian motto dating to World War II.

Reception
Borghild Maaland of Verdens Gang gave the movie a "die throw" of four, and called it "a pretty nice love-story". Inger Bentzrud of Dagbladet gave it five points, calling it "cheeky and different". She particularly appreciated the musical score, and the film's local atmosphere.

References

External links
 
 Alt for Egil at Filmweb.no

2004 films
2000s musical drama films
Norwegian drama films
2004 drama films
Norwegian musical films
2000s Norwegian-language films